Oleksandr Heorhiyovych Fyshchuk (born 12 January 1958, Borivtsi, Ukraine) is a Ukrainian state official and later politician, member of the Verkhovna Rada.

In 1990-2011 with breaks he worked at the State Tax Administration in Chernivtsi Oblast.

In 2012-2014 Fyshchuk was a member of the Verkhovna Rada as a non-partisan deputy of Batkivshchyna party.

From 5 February 2015 until 24 November 2018 he serves as Governor of Chernivtsi Oblast.

References

External links
 Profile at the Official Ukraine Today portal

1958 births
Living people
People from Chernivtsi Oblast
Chernivtsi University alumni
Governors of Chernivtsi Oblast
Seventh convocation members of the Verkhovna Rada
Front for Change (Ukraine) politicians
People's Front (Ukraine) politicians